Pleșeni is a commune in Cantemir District, Moldova. It is composed of three villages: Hănăseni, Pleșeni and Tătărășeni.

Pleșeni currently a growing population, between 1975 and 2015 growing 35.8%. Due to the expanding population, the median age is 29.3 years old, below the OECD average. The current population is estimated to be 2931 in 2015.

References

Communes of Cantemir District